ADAMTS13 endopeptidase (ADAMTS VWF cleaving metalloprotease, ADAMTS-13, ADAMTS13, vWF-cleaving protease, VWF-CP, vWF-degrading protease, Upshaw factor, von Willebrand factor cleaving protease, ADAMTS13 peptidase) is an enzyme. This enzyme catalyses the following chemical reaction

 The enzyme cleaves the von Willebrand factor at bond Tyr842-Met843 within the A2 domain

This enzyme belong in the peptidase family M12.

References

External links 
 

EC 3.4.24